Brisbane Convention & Exhibition Centre (BCEC) is a convention centre in Brisbane, Australia. It is located in South Brisbane and occupies most of the block formed by Grey Street, Melbourne Street, Merivale Street, and Glenelg Street. The centre is owned by South Bank Corporation and managed by ASM Global.

History
Designed by COX Architecture, the BCEC was constructed by Leighton Contractors, beginning in March 1993 with the demolition of World Expo Park. The building cost $170 million and was mostly funded by the Queensland Government's sale of a casino license, with the remainder funded directly by the government. The centre was completed in May 1995, and opened on 6 June.

Expansion
The design of an expansion to BCEC on Grey Street was approved in 2007. Laing O'Rourke was appointed as the project's builder in June 2009 after a delay caused by budget issues, and construction began in 2010. The project was completed in early 2012, and opened on 25 January. It cost $140 million and was funded by the Queensland Government. The five-level expansion has 25,000m² of floorspace and includes two auditoria for 400 and 600 with accompanying foyer space, speakers’ facilities, and private boardrooms.

Design
The building is 450 metres in length, 120 m wide and 24 m high.  The complex roof design is based on five hyperbolic paraboloids. The building is stabilised by concrete shear walls and clad in steel. A car park is located on the ground floor.

Events
BCEC hosts events such as the Brisbane International Boat Show, Home Show, Brides Wedding & Honeymoon Expo, World Travel Expo, graduation ceremonies for Griffith University and Southbank Institute of Technology, art shows, charity events.

The centre was selected as the hosting venue for the 2014 G-20 Australia summit.

Sports

From 1998 until 2008, the BCEC Great Hall was the home of three times National Basketball League (NBL) champions the Brisbane Bullets. The Bullets moved from the previous home, the 13,500 seat Brisbane Entertainment Centre, due in part to dwindling crowds and the cost of playing out of the Boondall based stadium. During the 2011-12 NBL season the Gold Coast Blaze played two home games at the centre.

The Convention Centre was also the home to the Brisbane-based netball side the Queensland Firebirds from 2008 to 2017. The Firebirds were a foundation club of the Commonwealth Bank Trophy (CBT) in 1997 and played at the 2,700 seat Chandler Arena. When the CBT was retired in 2007 and the ANZ Championship took its place the Firebirds moved to the new championship and also moved into the larger Convention Centre, becoming the venue's second major tenant alongside the Bullets. The team moved home games to the Brisbane Entertainment Centre after the 2017 season.

Gallery

See also

 Queensland Cultural Centre

References

External links

Cultural Centre Busway Station map - includes surrounding area - pdf file

Convention centres in Australia
Boxing venues in Australia
Tourist attractions in Brisbane
Netball venues in Queensland
Basketball venues in Australia
Cultural infrastructure completed in 1995
Infrastructure completed in 2012
1995 establishments in Australia
Event venues established in 1995
Sports venues completed in 1995
Sports venues in Brisbane
Brisbane Bullets
Queensland Firebirds
Defunct National Basketball League (Australia) venues
South Brisbane, Queensland
Philip Cox buildings
Venues of the 2032 Summer Olympics and Paralympics
Olympic badminton venues